Khaneh Khamis-e Olya (also Romanized as Khāneh Khamīs-e ‘Olyā; also known as Khānkhamīs-e ‘Olyā) is a village in Siyakh Darengun Rural District, in the Central District of Shiraz County, Fars Province, Iran. At the 2006 census, its population was 583, in 128 families.

References 

Populated places in Shiraz County